Laird Boswell is Professor of History  at the University of Wisconsin-Madison, specializing in the history of modern France. He was previous Assistant and then Associate Professor there, and before that, Instructor at the California Institute of Technology. He was visiting professor at Institut d’études politiques de Paris  in 2008.

Bibliography
Boswell, Laird. Rural Communism in France, 1920-1939. Ithaca: Cornell University Press, 1998. 
Translated into French by Guy Clermont as Le communisme rural en France : le Limousin et la Dordogne de 1920 à 1939    
Forging France along the Rhine: Cultural Conflict and National Identity in Alsace- Lorraine, 1919-2006
"L’historiographie du communisme  français est-elle dans une impasse? Revue française de science politique 55, no. 5-6 (2005): 919-934.
“Repenser l’histoire de l’Alsace grâce à l’histoire des régions frontalières,”   in Actes de l’Université européenne d’été (Strasbourg)
“Alsace-Lorraine,” in  Encyclopedia of Europe: 1789-1914. John Merriman and Jay Winter, eds. (New York: Charles Scribner’s, forthcoming).
“La petite propriété fait le communisme (Limousin, Dordogne),”  Etudes Rurales no. 171-172 (July–December 2004) : 73-82. 
“Fissures dans la nation française:  les réfugiés Alsaciens et Lorrains en 1939-1940,” in Max Lagarrigue ed., 1940, La France du repli, l’Europe de la défaite (Toulouse: Privat, 2001), 197-208.
“From Liberation to Purge Trials in the “Mythic Provinces:”  the Reconfiguration of Identities in Alsace and Lorraine, 1918-1920,”  French Historical Studies 23 (Winter 2000): 129-162.
“Franco-Alsatian Conflict and the Crisis of National Sentiment during the Phoney War,”  Journal of Modern History  (September 1999): 552-584.
“Le communisme et la défense de la petite propriété en Limousin et en Dordogne,” Communisme [Paris] 51-52 (1998):  7-27.
"The French Rural Communist Electorate," Journal of Interdisciplinary History 23 (Spring 1993): 719-749.
“How do French Peasants Vote?" Peasant Studies 16: 2 (Winter 1989):  107-122.

References

External links
Official Website at Wisconsin

Living people
University of Wisconsin–Madison faculty
Historians from California
Historians from Wisconsin
California Institute of Technology faculty
Year of birth missing (living people)
Historians of France
20th-century American historians
20th-century American male writers
21st-century American historians
21st-century American male writers
American male non-fiction writers